JIS X 0208 is a 2-byte character set specified as a Japanese Industrial Standard, containing 6879 graphic characters suitable for writing text, place names, personal names, and so forth in the Japanese language. It was originally established as JIS C 6226 in 1978, and has been revised in 1983, 1990, and 1997. It is also called Code page 952 by IBM. The 1978 version is also called Code page 955 by IBM.

Scope of use and compatibility 
This character set can be used for data processing and text processing.

Partial implementations of the character set are not considered compatible. Because there are places where such things have happened as the original drafting committee of the first standard taking care to separate characters between level 1 and level 2 and the second standard then shuffling some variant characters (異体字, itaiji) between the levels, at least in the first and second standards, it is conjectured that non-kanji and level 1-only implementation Japanese computer systems were at one time considered for development. However, such implementations have never been specified as compatible, though examples such as the early NEC PC-9801 did exist.

Even though there are provisions in the JIS X 0208:1997 standard concerning compatibility, at the present time, it is generally considered that this standard neither certifies compatibility nor is it an official manufacturing standard that amounts to a declaration of self-compatibility. Consequently, de facto, JIS X 0208-"compatible" products are not considered to exist.

Code charts

Lead byte 
The first encoding byte corresponds to the row or cell number plus 0x20, or 32 in decimal (see below). Hence, the code set starting with 0x21 has a row number of 1, and its cell 1 has a continuation byte of 0x21 (or 33), and so forth.

For lead bytes used for characters other than kanji, links are provided to charts on this page listing the characters encoded under that lead byte. For lead bytes used for kanji, links are provided to the appropriate section of Wiktionary's kanji index.

Non-Kanji rows

Character set 0x21 (row number 1, special characters) 
Some vendors use slightly different Unicode mapping for this set than the one below. For example, Microsoft maps kuten 1-29 (JIS 0x213D) to U+2015 (Horizontal Bar), whereas Apple maps it to U+2014 (Em Dash). Similarly, Microsoft maps kuten 1-61 (JIS 0x215D) to U+FF0D (the fullwidth form of U+002D Hyphen-Minus), and Apple maps it to U+2212 (Minus Sign). Unicode mapping of the wave dash also differs between vendors. See the cells with footnotes below.

ASCII and JISCII punctuation (shown here with a yellow background) may use alternative mappings to the Halfwidth and Fullwidth Forms block if used in an encoding which combines JIS X 0208 with ASCII or with JIS X 0201, such as Shift JIS, EUC-JP or ISO 2022-JP.

Character set 0x22 (row number 2, special characters) 
Most of the characters in this set were added in 1983, except for characters 0x2221–0x222E (kuten 2-1 through 2-14, or the first line of the chart below), which were included in the original 1978 version of the standard.

Character set 0x23 (row number 3, digits and Roman) 
This set includes a subset of the ISO 646 invariant set (and therefore also a subset of both ASCII and the JIS X 0201 Roman set), minus punctuation and symbols, comprising western Arabic numerals and both cases of the Basic Latin alphabet. Characters in this set may use alternative Unicode mappings to the Halfwidth and Fullwidth Forms block if used in an encoding which combines JIS X 0208 with ASCII or with JIS X 0201, such as EUC-JP, Shift JIS or ISO 2022-JP.

Compare row 3 of KPS 9566, which this row exactly matches. Compare and contrast row 3 of KS X 1001 and of GB 2312, which include their entire national variants of ISO 646 in this row, rather than only the alphanumeric subset.

Character set 0x24 (row number 4, Hiragana) 
This row contains Japanese Hiragana.

Compare row 4 of GB 2312, which matches this row. Compare and contrast row 10 of KPS 9566 and of KS X 1001, which use the same layout, but in a different row.

Character set 0x25 (row number 5, Katakana) 
This row contains Japanese Katakana.

Compare row 5 of GB 2312, which matches this row. Compare and contrast row 11 of KPS 9566 and of KS X 1001, which use the same layout, but in a different row. Contrast the considerably different Katakana layout used by JIS X 0201.

Character set 0x26 (row number 6, Greek) 
This row contains basic support for the modern Greek alphabet, without diacritics or the final sigma.

Compare row 6 of GB 2312 and GB 12345 and row 6 of KPS 9566, which include the same Greek letters in the same layout, although GB 12345 adds vertical presentation forms and KPS 9566 adds Roman numerals. Compare and contrast row 5 of KS X 1001, which offsets the Greek letters to include the Roman numerals first.

Character set 0x27 (row number 7, Cyrillic) 
This row contains the modern Russian alphabet and is not necessarily sufficient for representing other forms of the Cyrillic script.

Compare row 7 of GB 2312, which matches this row. Compare and contrast row 12 of KS X 1001 and row 5 of KPS 9566, which use the same layout (but in a different row).

Character set 0x28 (row number 8, box drawing) 
All characters in this set were added in 1983, and were not present in the original 1978 revision of the standard.

Extension character set 0x2D (row number 13, NEC special characters) 
Rows 9 through 15 of the JIS X 0208 standard are left empty.

However, the following layout for row 13, first introduced by NEC, is a common extension. It is used (with minor variations, noted in footnotes) by Windows-932 (which is matched by the WHATWG Encoding Standard used by HTML5), by the PostScript variant (but, since KanjiTalk version 7, not the regular variant) of MacJapanese, and by JIS X 0213 (the successor to JIS X 0208). Unlike the other extensions made by Windows-932/WHATWG and JIS X 0213, the two match rather than colliding, so decoding of most of this row is better supported than the other extensions made by JIS X 0213.

Kanji rows

Code structure 
In order to represent code points, column/line numbers are used for one-byte codes and kuten numbers are used for two-byte codes. For a way to identify a character without depending on a code, character names are used.

Single byte codes 
Almost all JIS X 0208 graphic character codes are represented with two bytes of at least seven bits each. However, every control character, as well as the plain space – although not the ideographic space – is represented with a one-byte code. Three high-order bits out of seven or four high-order bits out of eight, counting from zero to seven or from zero to fifteen respectively, form the column number. Four low-order bits counting from zero to fifteen form the line number. Each decimal number corresponds to one hexadecimal digit. For example, the bit combination corresponding to the graphic character "space" is 010 0000 as a 7-bit number, and 0010 0000 as an 8-bit number. In column/line notation, this is represented as 2/0. Other representations of the same single-byte code include 0x20 as hexadecimal, or 32 as a single decimal number.

Code points and code numbers 
This makes a total of 8836 (94 × 94) possible code points (although not all are assigned, see below); these are laid out in the standard in a 94-line, 94-column code table.

A row number and a cell number (each numbered from 1 to 94, for a standard JIS X 0208 code) form a  point, which is used to represent double-byte code points. A  is expressed in the form "row-cell", the row and cell numbers being separated by a hyphen. For example, the character "" has a code point at row 16, cell 1, so its code number is represented as "16-01".

In 7-bit JIS X 0208 (as might be switched to in JIS X 0202 / ISO-2022-JP), both bytes must be from the 94-byte range of 0x21 (used for row or cell number 1) through 0x7E (used for row or cell number 94) – exactly corresponding to the range used for 7-bit ASCII printing characters, not counting the space. Accordingly, the encoded bytes are obtained by adding 0x20 (32) to each number. For instance, the above example of 16-01 ("亜") would be represented by the bytes 0x30 0x21. The 8-bit EUC-JP instead uses the range 0xA1 through 0xFE (setting the high bit to 1), whereas other encodings such as Shift JIS use more complicated transforms. Shift JIS includes more encoding space than is needed for JIS X 0208 itself; some Shift JIS specific extensions to JIS X 0208 make use of row numbers above 94.

The later JIS X 0213 extends this structure by having more than one  of rows, which is also the structure used by CNS 11643, and related to the structure used by CCCII.

Unassigned code points 
Also, some cells in other rows are also essentially unassigned code points.

These empty areas contain code points that should basically not be used. Except when there is prior agreement among the relevant parties, characters (gaiji) for information interchange should not be assigned to the unassigned code points.

Even when assigning characters to unassigned code points, graphic characters defined in the standard should not be assigned to them, and the same character should not be assigned to multiple unassigned code points; characters should not be duplicated in the set.

Furthermore, when assigning characters to unassigned code points, it is necessary to be cautious of unification in regards to kanji glyphs. For example, row 25 cell 66 corresponds to the kanji meaning "high" or "expensive"; both the form with a component resembling the "mouth" character in the middle and the less common form with a ladder-like construction in the same location are subsumed into the same code point. Consequently, limiting point 25-66 to the "mouth" form and assigning the latter "ladder" form to an unassigned code point would technically be in violation of the standard.

In practice, however, several vendor-specific Shift JIS variants, including Windows-932 and MacJapanese, encode vendor extensions in unallocated rows of the encoding space for JIS X 0208. Also, most of the codes unassigned in JIS X 0208 are assigned by the newer JIS X 0213 standard.

Character names 

Each JIS X 0208 character is given a name. By using a character's name, it is possible to identify characters without relying on their codes. The names of characters are coordinated with other character set standards, notably the Universal Coded Character Set (UCS/Unicode), so this is one possible source of character mappings to character sets such as Unicode. For example, both the character at ISO/IEC 646 International Reference Version (US-ASCII) column 4 line 1 and the one at JIS X 0208 row 3 cell 33 have the name "LATIN CAPITAL LETTER A". Therefore, the character at 4/1 in ASCII and the character at 3-33 in JIS X 0208 can be regarded as the same character (although, in practice, alternative mapping is used for the JIS X 0208 character due to encodings providing ASCII separately). Conversely, ASCII characters 2/2 (quotation mark), 2/7 (apostrophe), 2/13 (hyphen-minus), and 7/14 (tilde) can be determined to be characters that do not exist in this standard.

Character names of non-kanji characters use uppercase Roman letters, spaces, and hyphens. The names of kanji, on the other hand, are mechanically set according to the corresponding hexadecimal representation of their code in UCS/Unicode. The name of a kanji can be arrived at by prepending the Unicode codepoint with "CJK UNIFIED IDEOGRAPH-". For example, row 16 cell 1 corresponds to U+4E9C in UCS, so the name of it would be "CJK UNIFIED IDEOGRAPH-4E9C". Kanji are not given Japanese common names.

Kanji set

Overview 

Special characters
Occupies rows 1 and 2. There are 18  such as the "ideographic space" (　), and the Japanese comma and period; eight diacritical marks such as dakuten and handakuten; 10 characters for  such as the Iteration mark; 22 ; 45 ; and 32 unit symbols, which includes the currency sign and the postal mark, for a total of 147 characters.
Numerals
Occupies part of row 3. The ten digits from "0" to "9".
Latin letters
Occupies part of row 3. The 26 letters of the English alphabet in uppercase and lowercase form for a total of 52.
Hiragana
Occupies row 4. Contains 48 unvoiced kana (including the obsolete wi and we), 20 voiced kana (dakuten), 5 semi-voiced kana (handakuten), 10 small kana for palatalized and assimilated sounds, for a total of 83 characters.
Katakana
Occupies row 5. There are 86 characters; in addition to the katakana equivalents of the hiragana characters, the small ka/ke kana (/) and the vu kana.
Greek letters
Occupies row 6. The 24 letters of the Greek alphabet in uppercase and lowercase form (minus the final sigma) for a total of 48.
Cyrillic letters
Occupies row 7. The 33 letters of the Russian alphabet in uppercase and lowercase form for a total of 66.
Box-drawing characters
Occupies row 8. Thin segments, thick segments, and mixed thin and thick segments, 32 total.
Kanji

Special characters, numerals, and Latin characters 
As for the special characters in the kanji set, some characters from the graphic character set of the International Reference Version (IRV) of ISO/IEC 646:1991 (equivalent to ASCII) are absent from JIS X 0208. There are the aforementioned four characters "QUOTATION MARK", "APOSTROPHE", "HYPHEN-MINUS", and "TILDE". The former three are split into different code points in the kanji set (Nishimura, 1978; JIS X 0221-1:2001 standard, Section 3.8.7). The "TILDE" of IRV has no corresponding character in the kanji set.

In the following table, the ISO/IEC 646:1991 IRV characters in question are compared with their multiple equivalents in JIS X 0208, except for the IRV character "TILDE", which is compared with the "WAVE DASH" of JIS X 0208. The entries under the "Symbol" columns utilize UCS/Unicode code points, so the specifics of display may differ.

The ASCII/IRV characters without exact JIS X 0208 equivalents were later assigned code points by JIS X 0213, these are also listed below, as are Microsoft's mapping of the four characters.

This means that the kanji set is the most widespread non-upward-compatible character set in the world; it is counted as one of the weak points of this standard.

Even with the 90 special characters, numerals, and Latin letters the kanji set and the IRV set have in common, this standard does not follow the arrangement of ISO/IEC 646. These 90 characters are split between rows 1 (punctuation) and 3 (letters and numbers), although row 3 does follow ISO 646 arrangement for the 62 letters and numbers alone (e.g. 4/1 ("A") in ISO 646 becomes 2/3 4/1 (i.e. 3-33) in JIS X 0208).

Ever since the first standard, it has been possible to represent  such as encircled numbers, ligatures for measurement unit names, and Roman numerals; they were not given independent kuten code points. Although individual companies that manufacture information systems can make an effort to represent these characters as customers may require by the composition of the characters, none has requested to have them added to the standard, instead choosing to proprietarily offer them as gaiji.

In the fourth standard (1997), all these characters were explicitly defined as characters that accompany an advancement of the current position; that is to say, they are spacing characters. Furthermore, it was ruled that they should not be made by the composition of characters. For this reason, it became disallowed to represent Latin characters with diacritics at all, with possibly the sole exception of the ångström symbol (Å) at row 2 cell 82.

Hiragana and katakana 
The hiragana and katakana in JIS X 0208, unlike JIS X 0201, includes dakuten and handakuten markings as part of a character.

The arrangement of kana in JIS X 0208 is different from the arrangement of katakana in JIS X 0201. On the other hand, in JIS X 0208, the kana are sorted first by gojūon order, then in the order of "small kana, full-size kana, kana with dakuten, and kana with handakuten" such that the same fundamental kana is grouped with its derivatives. This ordering was chosen in order to more simply facilitate the sorting of kana-based dictionary look-ups (Yasuoka, 2006).

As mentioned above, in this standard, the previously defined katakana order in JIS X 0201 was not followed in JIS X 0208. It is thought that the JIS X 0201 katakana being "half-width kana" arose due to the incompatibility with the katakana of this standard. This point is also one of the weaknesses of this standard.

Kanji 
How the kanji in this standard were chosen from what sources, why they are split into level 1 and level 2, and how they are arranged are all explained in detail in the fourth standard (1997). Per that explanation, the kanji included in the following four kanji listings were reflected in the 6349 characters of the first standard (1978).

The Information Processing Society of Japan kanji code committee compiled this list in 1971. In the below "Correspondence Analysis Results", this appears to be 6086 characters.

Selected by the Administrative Management Agency of Japan in 1975, it consists of 2817 characters.

One of the kanji listings that compose the "Correspondence Analysis Results", consisting of 3044 characters. It no longer exists. The original list was nonexistent for the original drafting committee; this kanji list was reflected in the standard to follow the "Correspondence Analysis Results".

One of the kanji listings that compose the "Correspondence Analysis Results", consisting of 3251 characters. The original drafting committee did not investigate the listing itself; the kanji used from this list followed the "Correspondence Analysis Results".

In the second and third standards, they added four and two characters to level 2, respectively, bringing the total kanji to 6355. Also, in the second standard, character forms were changed as well as transposition among the levels; in the third standard as well, character forms were changed. These are described further below.

Level partitioning 
The 2,965 Level 1 kanji occupy rows 16 to 47. The 3,390 Level 2 kanji occupy rows 48 to 84.

For level 1, characters common to multiple kanji glyph listings were chosen, using the tōyō kanji, the tōyō kanji correction draft, and the jinmeiyō kanji as a basis. Also, JIS C 6260 ("To-Do-Fu-Ken (Prefecture) Identification Code"; currently JIS X 0401) and JIS C 6261 ("Identification code for cities, towns and villages"; currently JIS X 0402) were consulted; kanji for nearly all Japanese prefectures, cities, districts, wards, towns, villages, and so forth were intentionally placed in level 1. Furthermore, amendments by experts were added.

Level 2 was dedicated to kanji that made an appearance in the aforementioned four major listings but were not selected for level 1. As noted below, the kanji of level 1 were ordered by their pronunciation, so among the kanji whose pronunciation were difficult to determine, there were those that were transferred from level 1 to level 2 on that basis (Nishimura, 1978).

Due to these decisions, for the most part, level 1 contains more frequently used kanji, and level 2 contains more infrequently used kanji, but of course, those were judged by the standards of the day; over the passage of time, some level 2 kanji have become more frequently used, such as one meaning "to soar" and one meaning "to glitter"; and inversely, some level 1 kanji have become infrequent, notably the ones meaning "centimeter" and "millimeter". Of the current jōyō kanji, 30 fall into level 2, while three are missing altogether (塡󠄀, 剝󠄀 and 頰󠄀). Of the current jinmeiyō kanji, 192 are in level 2, while 105 are not part of the standard.

Arrangement 
The kanji in level 1 are sorted in order of each one's "representative reading" (i.e. a canonical reading chosen for the purposes of this standard only); the reading of a kanji for this may be an on or a kun reading; readings are sorted in gojūon order. As a general rule, the on (Chinese-sound) reading is considered the representative reading; where a kanji has multiple on readings, the reading judged to be predominant in use frequency is used for the representative reading (JIS C 6226-1978 standard, Section 3.4). For the small percentage of kanji that either do not have an on reading or have an on reading which is little known and not in common use, the kun reading was employed as the representative reading. Where a verb kun reading must be used as the representative reading, the ren'yōkei (rather than the shūshikei) form is used.

For example, cells 1 to 41 on row 16 are 41 characters sorted as starting with a reading of a. Within these, 22 characters, including 16-10 (: on reading "ki"; kun reading "aoi") and 16-32 (: on readings "zoku" and "shoku"; kun reading "awa") are there on the basis of their kun readings. 16-09 (: on reading "hō", kun reading "a(i)") and 16-23 (: on readings "sō" and "kyū", kun reading "atsuka(i)") are just two examples of ren'yōkei-form verbs used for the representative reading.

Where the representative reading is the same between different kanji, a kanji that uses an on reading is placed ahead of one that uses a kun reading. Where the on or kun readings are the same between more than one kanji, they are then ordered by their primary radical and stroke count.

Whether on level 1 or level 2, itaiji are arranged to directly follow their exemplar form. For example, in level 2, right after row 49 cell 88, the immediately following characters deviate from the general rule (stroke count in this case) to include three variants of 49-88 (and ).

The kanji in level 2 are arranged in order of primary radical and stroke count. Where these two properties are the same for different kanji, they are then sorted by reading.

Kanji from unknown sources 

It has been pointed out that there are kanji in the kanji set that are not found in comprehensive, unabridged kanji dictionaries, and that the sources thereof are unknown. For example, only one year after the first standard was established, Tajima (1979) reported that he had confirmed 63 kanji that were not to be found in Shinjigen (a large kanji dictionary published by Kadokawa Shoten), nor in Dai Kan-Wa jiten, and they did not make sense as ryakuji of any sort; he noted that it would be preferable for kanji not available in kanji dictionaries to be selected from definite sources.

The drafting committee for the fourth version of the standard also saw the existence of kanji with sources unknown as a problem, and so made an inquiry into just what kind of sources the drafting committee of the first version referenced. As a result, it was discovered that the original drafting committee had heavily relied on the "Correspondence Analysis Results" to collect kanji. When the drafting committee investigated the "Correspondence Analysis Results", it became clear that many of the kanji included in the kanji set but not found in exhaustive kanji dictionaries supposedly came from the "Japanese Personality Registration Name Kanji" and "Kanji for National Administrative District Listing" lists mentioned in the "Correspondence Analysis Results".

It was confirmed that no original text for the "Japanese Personality Registration Name Kanji" referenced in the "Correspondence Analysis Results" exists. For the "National Administrative District Listing", Sasahara Hiroyuki of the fourth version's drafting committee examined the kanji that appeared on the in-progress development pages for the first standard. The committee also consulted many ancient writings, as well as many examples of personal names in a database of NTT phone books.

Due to this thorough investigation, the committee was able to pare down the number of kanji for which the source cannot be confidently explained to twelve, shown on the adjacent table. Of these, it is conjectured that several glyphs came about due to copying errors. In particular, 妛 was probably created when printers tried to create 𡚴 by cutting and pasting 山 and 女 together. A shadow from that process was misinterpreted as a line, resulting in 妛 (a picture of this can be found in the Jōyō kanji jiten).

Unification of kanji variants 
According to the specifications in the fourth standard (1997),  is the action of giving the same code point to a character without regard to its different character forms. In the fourth standard, the glyphs allowed are limited; the extent to which particular allographic glyphs are unified into a graphemic code point is clearly defined.

For a single glyph, there exist an endless range of possible concretely and/or visibly different character forms.

The extent to which a glyph is unified to one code point is determined according to that code point's  and the  that can be applied to that example glyph; that is, the example glyph for a code point applies to that code point, and any glyphs for which the parts that compose the example glyph are replaced in accordance with the unification criteria also apply to that code point.

For example, the example glyph at 33-46 is composed of radical 9 and the kanji that eventually spawned the so kana. Also, in unification criterion 101, there are three kanji displayed: the first takes the form most often seen in Japanese; the second contains a more traditional form in which the first two strokes form radical 12 (the kanji numeral for the number 8); and the third is like the second, except that radical 12 is inverted. Consequently, all three permutations all apply to the code point at line 33 cell 46.

In the fourth standard, including one of the errata for the first printing, there are 186 unification criteria.

When a code point's example glyph is composed of more than one part glyph, unification criteria can be applied to each part. After a unification criterion is applied to one part glyph, that part cannot have any more unification criteria applied to it. Also, a unification criterion is not allowed to apply if the resulting glyph would coincide with that of another code point entirely.

An example glyph is no more than an example for that code point; it is not a glyph "endorsed" by the standard. Also, the unification criteria need only be used for generally used kanji and for the purpose of assigning things to the code points of this standard. The standard requests that generally unused kanji not be created based on the example glyphs and unification criteria.

The kanji of the kanji set are not chosen completely consistently according to the unification criteria. For example, although 41-7 corresponds to the form where the third and fourth strokes cross as well as the form where they don't according to unification criterion 72, 20-73 only corresponds to the form where they do not cross, and 80-90 only corresponds to the form where they do.

The terms "unification", "unification criteria", and "example glyph" were adopted in the fourth standard. "Equivalence" included, other than kanji with exactly the same shape, kanji with differences due to style, and kanji where the difference in character form is small.

In the first standard, it was stipulated that "this standard ... does not establish the particulars of character forms" (Section 3.1); it also states that "the aim of this standard is to establish the general idea of characters and their codes; the design of their character forms and such lie outside its scope." In the second and third standards as well, notes to the effect that specific designs of character forms lie outside its scope (the note on item 1). The fourth standard also stipulates that "This standard regulates graphic characters as well as their bit patterns, and the use, specific designs of individual characters, and so forth are not within the scope of this standard" (JIS X 0208:1997, item 1).

Unification criteria for compatibility 
In the fourth standard,  is defined. Their application is limited to 29 code points whose glyphs vary greatly between the standards JIS C 6226-1983 on and after and JIS C 6226-1978. For those 29 code points, the glyphs from JIS C 6226-1983 on and after are displayed as "A", and the glyphs from JIS C 6226-1978 as "B". On each of them, both "A" and "B" glyphs may be applied. However, in order to claim compatibility with the standard, whether the "A" or "B" form has been used for each code point must be explicitly noted.

Character encodings

Encoding schemes stipulated by JIS X 0208 
In JIS X 0208:1997, article 7 combined with appendices 1 and 2 define a total of eight encoding schemes.

In the descriptions below, the "CL" (control left), "GL" (graphic left), "CR" (control right), and "GR" (graphic right) regions are respectively, in column/line notation, from 0/0 to 1/15, from 2/1 to 7/14, from 8/0 to 9/15, and from 10/1 to 15/14. For each code, 2/0 is assigned the graphic character "SPACE" and 7/15 the control character "DELETE". The C0 control characters (defined in JIS X 0211 and matching ISO/IEC 6429) are assigned to the CL region.

7-bit encoding for kanji
Stipulated in the standard itself. The JIS X 0208 double-byte set is assigned to the GL region.
8-bit encoding for kanji
Stipulated in the standard itself. Same as the 7-bit encoding, but defined in terms of 8-bit bytes. The CR region may be unused, or encode the C1 control characters from JIS X 0211. The GR region is unused.
International Reference Version + 7-bit encoding for kanji
Stipulated in the standard itself. The shift in control character designates the ISO/IEC 646:1991 IRV (International Reference Version, equivalent to US-ASCII) to the GL region. Shift out designates the JIS X 0208 double-byte set to the same region.
Latin characters + 7-bit encoding for kanji
Stipulated in the standard itself. As with IRV+7-bit, but with ISO/IEC 646:IRV replaced with ISO/IEC 646:JP (the Roman set of JIS X 0201).
International Reference Version + 8-bit encoding for kanji
Stipulated in the standard itself. ISO/IEC 646:IRV is assigned to the GL region, JIS X 0208 to the GR region. This is effectively a subset of EUC-JP, excluding the half-width katakana from JIS X 0201 and the supplemental kanji from JIS X 0212.
Latin characters + 8-bit encoding for kanji
Stipulated in the standard itself. As with IRV+8-bit, but with ISO/IEC 646:IRV replaced with ISO/IEC 646:JP.
Shift-coded character set
Stipulated in Appendix 1: . The authoritative definition of Shift JIS.
RFC 1468-coded character set
Stipulated in Appendix 2: . Resembles ISO-2022-JP (which is authoritatively defined in RFC 1468) but is defined in terms of eight-bit bytes, whereas ISO-2022-JP is defined in terms of seven-bit bytes.

Among the encodings stipulated in the fourth standard, only the "Shift" coded character set is registered by the IANA. However, certain others are closely related to IANA-registered encodings defined elsewhere (EUC-JP and ISO-2022-JP).

Escape sequences for JIS X 0202 / ISO 2022 
JIS X 0208 may be used within ISO 2022/JIS X 0202 (of which ISO-2022-JP is a subset). The escape sequences to designate JIS X 0208 to each of the four ISO 2022 code sets are listed below. Here, "ESC" refers to the control character "Escape" (0x1B, or 1/11).

The escape sequence starting ESC 2/4 selects a multi-byte character set. The escape sequence starting ESC 2/6 specifies a revision of the upcoming character set selection. JIS C 6226:1978 is identified by the multibyte-94-set identifier byte 4/0 (corresponding to ASCII @). JIS C 6226:1983 / JIS X 0208:1983 is identified by the multibyte-94-set identifier byte 4/2 (B). JIS X 0208:1990 is also identified by the 94-set identifier byte 4/2, but can be distinguished with the revision identifier 4/0 (@).

Duplicate encodings of ASCII and JIS X 0201 

When using the kanji set of this standard with either the ISO/IEC 646:1991 IRV graphic character set (ASCII) or JIS X 0201's graphic character set for Latin characters (JIS-Roman), the treatment of the characters common to both sets becomes problematic. Unless one takes special measures, the characters included in both sets do not all map to each other one-to-one, and a single character may be given more than one code point; that is, it may cause a duplicate encoding.

JIS X 0208:1997, in regards to when a character is common to both sets, basically forbids the use of the code point in the kanji set (which is one of two code points), eliminating duplicate encodings. It is judged that characters that have the same name are the same character.

For example, both the name of the character corresponding to the bit pattern 4/1 in ASCII and the name of the character corresponding to row 3 cell 33 of the kanji set are "LATIN CAPITAL LETTER A". In International Reference Version + 8-bit code for kanji, whether by the bit pattern 4/1 or by the bit pattern corresponding to the kanji set's row 3 cell 33 (10/3 12/1), the letter "A" (i.e. "LATIN CAPITAL LETTER A") is represented. The standard forbids the use of the "10/3 12/1" bit pattern, in an attempt to eliminate the duplicate encoding.

In consideration to implementations that treat the characters of the code points in the kanji set as "full-width characters" and those of ASCII or JIS-Roman as different characters, the use of the kanji set code points is permitted only for the sake of backwards compatibility. For example, for the purpose of backwards compatibility, it is permitted to consider 10/3 12/1 in International Reference Version + 8-bit code for kanji to correspond to a full-width "A".

If the kanji set is used along with ASCII or JIS-Roman, then even if the standard is abided by strictly, the unique encoding of a character is not guaranteed. For example, in the International Reference Version + 8-bit code for kanji, it is valid to represent a hyphen with the bit pattern 2/13 for the character "HYPHEN-MINUS", as well as with the kanji set's row 1 cell 30 (bit pattern 10/1 11/14) for the character "HYPHEN". In addition, the standard does not define which of the two to use for what, and so the hyphen is not given one unique encoding. The same problem affects the minus sign, the quotation marks, and so forth.

Moreover, even if the kanji set is used as a separate code, there is no guarantee that the unique encoding of characters is implemented. In many cases, however, the full-width "IDEOGRAPHIC SPACE" at row 1 cell 1 and the half-width space (2/0) coexist. How the two should be different is not self-explanatory, and is not specified in the standard.

Comparison of encoding schemes used in practice

History 
Until five years have passed after a Japanese Industrial Standard has been established, reaffirmed, or revised, the prior standard undergoes a process of reaffirmation, revision, or withdrawal. Since establishment, the standard has been subject to revision three times, and at present, the fourth standard is valid.

First standard 
The first standard is JIS C 6226-1978 , established by the Japanese Minister of International Trade and Industry on 1 January 1978. It is also called 78JIS for short. Entrusted by the Agency of Industrial Science and Technology, a JIPDEC kanji code standardization research and study committee produced the draft. The committee chairman was Moriguchi Shigeichi.

The code included 453 non-Kanji (including Hiragana, Katakana, the Roman, Greek and Cyrillic alphabets and punctuation) and 6349 Kanji (2965 level 1 Kanji and 3384 level 2 Kanji) for a total of 6802 characters. It did not yet include box-drawing characters. The standard itself was set in Shaken Co., Ltd's Ishii Mincho typeface.

Second standard 
The second standard JIS C 6226-1983  revised the first standard on 1 September 1983. It is also called 83JIS. Entrusted by the AIST, a JIPDEC kanji code-related JIS committee produced the draft. The committee chairman was Motooka Tōru.

The draft of the second standard was based on the consideration of factors such as the promulgation of the jōyō kanji, the enforcement of the jinmeiyō kanji, and the standardization of Japanese-language Teletex by the Ministry of Posts and Telecommunications; also, the next modification was performed to keep pace with JIS C 6234-1983 (24-pixel matrix printer character forms; presently JIS X 9052).

Addition of special characters
39 characters were added to the special characters. Among these 39, per JICST recommendations, and from such standards as JIS Z 8201-1981 (mathematical symbols) and JIS Z 8202-1982 (quantity, unit, and chemical symbols), things that could not be represented by composition were chosen.
Newly added box-drawing characters
32 box-drawing characters were added.
Swapping of itaiji code points
Code points for 22 variant pairs of Kanji were swapped, such that the variant in level 2 was moved to level 1 and vice versa. For example, (level 1's) row 36 cell 59 in the first standard was moved to (level 2's) row 52 cell 68; the point originally at row 52 cell 68 was in turn moved to row 36 cell 59.
Additions to the level 2 kanji
Three characters from level 1 and one character from level 2 were given new code points at previously unassigned code points in row 84 as level 2 kanji. Itaiji for each of those code points were newly assigned to their original locations. For example, row 84 cell 1 in the second standard was moved there to accommodate a different form not included in the first standard at row 22 cell 38 as a level 1 kanji.
Modification of character forms
The character forms of approximately 300 kanji were amended.

Among the changes in those 300 or so kanji character forms, many level 1 glyphs that were in the style of the Kangxi Dictionary were changed into variants, and especially more simplified forms (e.g. ryakuji and extended shinjitai). For example, a couple of code points that are often the subject of criticism due to being greatly changed are row 18 cell 10 (78JIS: ,) and row 38 cell 34 (78JIS: ,).

There were many smaller changes away from the Kangxi-style variants; for example, row 25 cell 84 lost part of a stroke. Also, where some glyphs for level 1 kanji were not Kangxi-style forms, there were some changed into their Kangxi-style forms; for example, row 80 cell 49 gained part of a stroke (i.e., the same part of the stroke that 25-84 lost).

In order to elucidate the original intent of the first standard, these ended up falling into parameters for unification criteria in the fourth standard. The difference in form for the examples noted above ("" and "") falls under the parameters for unification criterion 42 (concerning the component "").

The bulk of the changes to character forms are differences between level 1 and level 2 kanji. Specifically, simplification was done more often for level 1 kanji than for level 2 kanji; simplifications applied to level 1 kanji (e.g. "" to "" and "" to "") were not generally applied to kanji in level 2 ("" stayed as-is). The aforementioned 25-84 and 80-49 were given different treatment likewise, as the former is in level 1 and the latter is in level 2. Even so, there were some changes regardless of the level; for instance characters containing the "door" and "winter" components were changed with no different treatment between level 1 and level 2 kanji.

However, for 29 code points (such as the problematic 18-10 and 38-34 mentioned above), the forms inherited by the fourth standard contradicts the original intent of the first. For these, there are special unification criteria to maintain compatibility with the previous standards at these code points.

When the new "X" category for Japanese Industrial Standards (for information-related fields) was introduced, the second standard was re-termed JIS X 0208-1983 on 1 March 1987.

Third standard 
The third standard JIS X 0208-1990  revised the second standard on 1 September 1990. It is also called 90JIS for short. Entrusted by the AIST, a committee at the Japanese Standards Association for the revision of JIS X 0208 created the draft. The committee chairman was Tajima Kazuo.

225 kanji glyphs were changed, and two characters were added to level 2 (84-05 "" and 84-06 ""). This was a disunification of itaiji for two characters already included (49-59 "" and 63-70 ""). Some of the changes and the two additions corresponded to the 118 jinmeiyō kanji added in March 1990. The standard itself was set in Heisei Mincho.

Fourth standard 
The fourth standard JIS X 0208:1997  revised the third standard on 20 January 1997. It is also called 97JIS for short. Entrusted by the AIST, a JSA committee for research and study of coded character sets produced the draft. The committee chairman was Shibano Kōji.

The basic policies of this revision were to perform no changes the character set, to clarify ambiguous provisions, and to make the standard relatively easier to use. Addition, removal, and code point rearrangement were not done, and without exception, the example glyphs were also left unchanged. However, the stipulations of the standard were completely re-written and/or supplemented. Whereas the third standard was 65 pages long without the explanations, the fourth standard was 374 pages without the explanations.

The main points of the revision are:

Definition of encoding methods
Until the third standard, only the encoding method based on JIS X 0202 code extension was defined. This is something unusual as far as coded character sets go. In the fourth standard, encoding methods that do not use escape sequences for the purpose of code extension were defined.
Definition of the general prohibition of the use of unassigned code points and methods of usage for unassigned code points
The third standard, in an explanation that was not part of the standard, described things as if there were places where for some unassigned code points, it was acceptable to assign gaiji. In the fourth standard, it was clarified that use of unassigned code points is generally prohibited. Also, the conditions for the usage of unassigned code points were specified.
General elimination of duplicate encodings
Each character was given a "character name" that maps to those of other standards. Also, encoding methods to use them together with the ISO/IEC 646's International Reference Version or JIS X 0201 were specified. When JIS X 0208 is used together with either, among two assigned code points for characters with the same name, only one is permitted; thus, duplicate encodings were generally eliminated.
Investigation into sources of kanji
Characters included in the standard so far that are found in neither the Kangxi Dictionary nor the Dai Kanwa Jiten were identified. Accordingly, exactly with what purpose for inclusion and from which sources these kanji came during compilation of the first standard was investigated.
Definition of kanji unification criteria
Based on things such as the materials for the drafting of the first standard, an attempt was made to restore the intent of the first standard for the scope of the glyphs each code point represents. Moreover, the criteria for unifying kanji glyphs were clearly defined.
Inclusion of de facto standards
By the time of the fourth standard, the encoding methods Shift JIS and ISO-2022-JP had become de facto standards for personal computing and e-mail, respectively. These encoding methods were included as "Shift-Coded Representation" and "RFC 1468-Coded Representation" (described above).

Successors  

JIS X 0213 (extended kanji) was designed "with the goal being to offer a sufficient character set for the purposes of encoding the modern Japanese language that JIS X 0208 intended to be from the start"; it defines a character set that expands upon the kanji set of JIS X 0208. The drafters of JIS X 0213 recommend migration from JIS X 0208 to JIS X 0213, among the advantages being JIS X 0213's compatibility with the Hyōgai Kanji Glyph List and with newer jinmeiyō kanji.

Contrary to the expectations of the drafters, adoption of JIS X 0213 has been anything but fast since its enactment in the year 2000. The drafting committee of JIS X 0213:2004 wrote (in the year 2004), "The status where 'what the majority of information systems can use in common is JIS X 0208 only' still continues." (JIS X 0213:2000, Appendix 1:2004, section 2.9.7)

For Microsoft Windows, the predominant operating system (and hence supplying the predominant desktop environment) in the personal computing sector, the JIS X 0213 repertoire has been included since Windows Vista, released in November 2006. Mac OS X has been compatible with JIS X 0213 since version 10.1 (released in 2001). Many Unix-likes such as Linux can (optionally) support JIS X 0213 if desired. Therefore, it is thought that with time, JIS X 0213 support on personal computers will not be an impediment to its eventual adoption.

Among the drafters of JIS X 0213, there are those who expect to see a mix of JIS X 0208 and JIS X 0213 before any adoption of JIS X 0213 (Satō, 2004). However, JIS X 0208 continues to be used for the present, and many predict it to endure as a standard. There are barriers that need to be overcome if JIS X 0213 is to supplant JIS X 0208 in common usage:

 The character repertoires utilized in Japanese mobile phones at the present time are based on JIS X 0208. There are no officially announced plans whatsoever to migrate these to JIS X 0213 compatibility. As mobile phones are now a pervasive aspect of Japanese textual communication (see Japanese mobile phone culture), being a widespread, commonly accessed medium for sending e-mail and accessing the World Wide Web, a lack of adoption for mobile phones deters usage elsewhere.
 JIS X 0213 is not strictly upward-compatible with JIS X 0208 in terms of unification criteria (see below). For large-scale archives (e.g. bibliographic databases and Aozora Bunko) that use JIS X 0208 and follow its unification criteria strictly, it is thought that it would be extremely difficult work to both convert all the data to JIS X 0213 and preserve the same standard of textual integrity.
 In practice, many systems define and use unassigned code points in JIS X 0208. For example, Windows assigns IBM and NEC extended characters and user-defined character areas (see Windows-932), and mobile phones assign emoji in some such places. The code points of these gaiji conflict with the code points that JIS X 0213 codes use, so there would be some difficulty in migrating these systems from JIS X 0208 to JIS X 0213. There are also plans to migrate to UCS/Unicode and use the JIS X 0213 repertoire from there, but until a system administrator is able to judge that the implementations of UCS/Unicode surrogate pairs and character compositions are sufficiently stable, he or she is likely to hesitate to use the repertoire of JIS X 0213 that requires those implementations.
 The improvements provided by JIS X 0213 are mostly in the realm of characters that are not used as often as the ones already present in JIS X 0208. Because there are nearly twice as many glyphs that need to be implemented for less usage of those extra glyphs, it can be a low return on investment in many cases, especially where resources are constrained.

Implementations 
Because JIS X 0208 / JIS C 6226 is primarily a character set and not a strictly defined character encoding, several companies have implemented their own encodings of the character set.
Apple Computer Inc.: MacJapanese (Shift_JIS based)
Fujitsu: JEF kanji code (EBCDIC based)
Hitachi Ltd.: KEIS (EBCDIC based)
IBM: various, including IBM-932 and IBM-942 (both Shift_JIS based)
Microsoft: Windows-932 (Shift_JIS based)
NEC: JIPS

Several of these incorporate vendor-specific character assignments in place of unallocated regions of the standard. These include Windows-932 and MacJapanese, as well as NEC's PC98 character encoding. While IBM-932 and IBM-942 also include vendor assignments, they include them outside of the region used for JIS X 0208.

Relation to other standards

ISO/IEC 646 IRV and ASCII 
As noted above, the kanji set is not upwardly compatible with the ISO/IEC 646:1991 IRV (ASCII) graphic character set. The kanji set and the IRV graphic character set can be used together as specified in JIS X 0208 (IRV + 7-bit code for kanji and IRV + 8-bit code for kanji). They can be used together in EUC-JP as well.

JIS X 0201 
The kanji set lacks three characters included in JIS X 0201's graphic character set for Latin characters: 2/2 (QUOTATION MARK), 2/7 (APOSTROPHE), and 2/13 (HYPHEN-MINUS). The kanji set contains all character included in JIS X 0201's graphic character set for katakana.

The kanji set and the graphic character set for Latin characters can be used together as specified in JIS X 0208 (Latin characters + 7-bit code for kanji and the Latin characters + 8-bit code for kanji). The kanji set, graphic character set for Latin characters, and JIS X 0201's graphic character set for katakana can be used together as specified in JIS X 0208 (the shift-coded character set; i.e. Shift JIS). The kanji set and graphic character set for katakana can be used together in EUC-JP.

JIS X 0212 
JIS X 0212 (supplementary kanji) defines additional characters with code points for the purposes of information processing that requires characters not found in JIS X 0208. Rather than allocating characters within the main JIS X 0208 kanji set, it defines a second 94-by-94 kanji set containing supplementary characters.

JIS X 0212 can be used with JIS X 0208 in EUC-JP. Also, JIS X 0208 and JIS X 0212 are both source standards for UCS/Unicode's Han unification, meaning that kanji from both sets can be included in one Unicode-format document.

Among the code points that the second version of JIS X 0208 changed, 28 code points in JIS X 0212 reflect the character forms from before the changes. Also, JIS X 0212 reassigns the "closure mark" that JIS X 0208 had assigned as a non-kanji (at row 1 cell 26) as a kanji (at row 16 cell 17). JIS X 0212 has no characters in common with JIS X 0208 other than these. Hence, it is not suited for general use on its own.

However, in the fourth version of JIS X 0208, the connection to JIS X 0212 was not defined at all. It is believed that this is because the drafting committee of the fourth JIS X 0208 standard had a critical opinion of the selection and identification methods of JIS X 0212. The character meanings and selection rationales were not properly documented, making it difficult to identify whether desired kanji corresponded to those in its repertoire. The text of the fourth standard, as well as pointing out the problematic points of the character selection of JIS X 0212, states that "it is thought that not only is character selection impossible, it is also impossible to use together; the connection to JIS X 0212 is not defined at all." (section 3.3.1)

JIS X 0213 

JIS X 0213 (extension kanji) defines a kanji set that expands upon the kanji set of JIS X 0208. According to this standard, it is "designed with the goal being to offer a sufficient character set for the purposes of encoding the modern Japanese language that JIS X 0208 intended to be from the start."

The kanji set of JIS X 0213 incorporates all characters that can be represented in the kanji set of JIS X 0208, with many additions. In total, JIS X 0213 defines 1183 non-kanji and 10,050 kanji (for a total of 11,233 characters), within two 94-by-94 . The first plane (non-kanji and level 1–3 kanji) is based on JIS X 0208, whereas the second plane (level 4 kanji) is designed to fit within the unallocated rows of JIS X 0212, allowing use in EUC-JP. JIS X 0213 also defines Shift_JISx0213, a variant of Shift_JIS capable of encoding the entirety of JIS X 0213.

For most intents and purposes, JIS X 0213 plane 1 is a superset of JIS X 0208. However, different unification criteria are applied to some code points in JIS X 0213 compared to JIS X 0208. Consequently, some pairs of kanji glyphs that were represented by one JIS X 0208 code point, due to being unified, are given separate code points in JIS X 0213. For example, the glyph at row 33 cell 46 of JIS X 0208 ("", described above) unifies a few variants due to its right-hand component. In JIS X 0213, two forms (the ones containing the component "") are unified on plane 1 row 33 cell 46, and the other (containing the component "") is located at plane 1 row 14 cell 41. Therefore, whether JIS X 0208 row 33 cell 46 should be mapped to JIS X 0213 plane 1 row 33 cell 46 or plane 1 row 14 cell 41 cannot be determined automatically. This limits the extent to which JIS X 0213 can be considered upwardly compatible with JIS X 0208, as admitted by the JIS X 0213 drafting committee.

However, for the most part, row m cell n in JIS X 0208 corresponds to plane 1 row m cell n in JIS X 0213; therefore, not much confusion arises in practice. This is because most typefaces have come to use the glyphs exemplified in JIS X 0208, and most users are not consciously aware of the unification criteria.

ISO/IEC 10646 and Unicode 
The kanji set of JIS X 0208 is among the original source standards for the Han unification in ISO/IEC 10646 (UCS) and Unicode. Every kanji in JIS X 0208 corresponds to its own code point in UCS/Unicode's Basic Multilingual Plane (BMP).

The non-kanji in JIS X 0208 also correspond to their own code points in the BMP. However, for some special characters, some systems implement a different correspondences from those of UCS/Unicode's (which are based on the character names given JIS X 0208:1997).

Footnotes

Explanatory

Reference footnotes

See also 
 JIS coded character sets
 JIS X 0201 "7-bit and 8-bit coded character sets for information interchange"
 JIS X 0202 "Information technology – Character code structure and extension techniques" (ISO/IEC 2022)
 JIS X 0208 "7-bit and 8-bit double byte coded KANJI sets for information interchange"
 JIS X 0211 "Control functions for coded character sets" (ISO/IEC 6429)
 JIS X 0212 "Code of the supplementary Japanese graphic character set for information interchange"
 JIS X 0213 "7-bit and 8-bit double byte coded extended KANJI sets for information interchange"
 JIS X 0221 "Universal Multiple-Octet Coded Character Set (UCS)" (ISO/IEC 10646)
 Extended shinjitai
 Help:Japanese

References 
For the purposes of citation, these Japanese names are presented as if they were in Western order where Romanized, and retain Eastern order where not.
 Nishimura, Hirohiko [], 1978. The Kanji JIS []. Standardization Journal [], 171: 3–8.
 Nomura, Masaaki [], 1984. Revision of JIS C 6226: Kanji codes for information interchange []. Standardization Journal [], 14 (3): 4–9.
 Ogata, Katsuhiro [], 2006a. Things that were not unified in 97JIS among the example glyphs changed in JIS C 6226-1983 (83JIS) [] (accessed 29 January 2007).
 Ogata, Katsuhiro [], 2006b. Things that fell within the scope of unification among the example glyphs changed in JIS C 6226-1983 (83JIS) [] (accessed 29 January 2007).
 Satō, Takayuki [], 2004. Concerning the revision of JIS X 0213 (7-bit and 8-bit double byte coded extended Kanji sets for information interchange) []. Standardization Journal [], 34 (4): 8–12.
 Shibano, Kōji [], 1997a. Concerning the revision of JIS X 0208 (7-bit and 8-bit double byte coded Kanji sets for information interchange ) []. Standardization Journal [], 27 (3): 8–12.
 Shibano, Kōji [], 1997b. Plan for the extension of the JIS kanji []. Standardization Journal [], 27 (7): 5–11.
 Shibano, Kōji [], 2000. Establishment of JIS X 0213 (7-bit and 8-bit double byte coded extended Kanji sets for information interchange) []. Standardization Journal [], 30 (3): 3–7.
 Shibano, Kōji [], 2001. Concerning  JIS kanji []. Standardization and Quality Control [], 54 (8): 44–50.
 Shibano, Kōji [] (editor), 2002. JIS Kanji Dictionary, enlarged and revised edition []. Tokyo: Japanese Standards Association.
 Shibano, Kōji [], 2002. The development of kanji and Japanese language processing technologies: the standardization of kanji codes []. IPSJ Magazine [], 43 (12): 1362–1367
 Tajima, Kazuo [], 1979. Problems concerning the use of the JIS kanji listing: design and handling of kanji in kanji processing systems []. Journal of Information Processing Society of Japan [], 21 (10): 753–761.
 Uchida, Tomio [], 1990. Establishment of JIS X 0212 (Kanji Codes for Information Interchange – Supplemental Kanji) []. Standardization Journal [], 20 (11): 6–11.
 Yasuoka, Kōichi [], 2001a. Situation of the Newest Character Codes in Japan (former part) []. Systems, Control and Information [], 45 (9): 528–535.
 Yasuoka, Kōichi [], 2001b. Situation of the Newest Character Codes in Japan (latter part) []. Systems, Control and Information [], 45 (12): 687–694.
 Yasuoka, Kōichi [], 2006 "Differences between the JIS kanji plan (1976) and JIS C 6226-1978" [] at the 17th "Computer Usage for Oriental Studies" [] research seminar. 3–51.
 Yasuoka, Kōichi [] & Motoko Yasuoka [], 2006. The History of Character Codes: Europe, America, and Japan []. Tokyo: Kyōritsu Shuppan.

External links 

 The International Register that the IPSJ/ITSCJ supervises.
Japanese Character Set JIS C 6226-1978
Japanese Character Set JIS C 6226-1983
Update Registration 87 Japanese Graphic Character Set for Information Interchange
  Japanese Industrial Standards Committee database search (the latest standard may be read here).
  Japanese Standards Association database search: (a copy of the latest standard may be purchased here).
  Unification-related provisions in the JIS X 0208 and 0213 standards
  Cyber Librarian – JIS kanji listing

Character sets
Encodings of Japanese
JIS standards
Computer-related introductions in 1978